Atlético Sport Aviação is a multisports club from Luanda, Angola. The club's women's handball team competes at the local level, at the Luanda Provincial Handball Championship and at the Angola National Handball Championship as well as at continental level, at the annual African Handball Champions League competitions.

Honours

National Championship:
Winner (1): 1999
 Runner Up (4) : 2001, 2005, 2007, 2008

Angola Cup:
Winner (N/A): 
 Runner Up (3) : 2006, 2007, 2008

Angola Super Cup :
Winner (1): 2007
 Runner Up (1) : 2009

CHAB Club Champions Cup:
Winner (0): 
 Runner Up (1) : 2007

CHAB Babacar Fall Super Cup:
Winner (0): 
 Runner Up (0) :

CHAB Cup Winner's Cup:
Winner (0): 
 Runner Up (0) :

Squad

Players

Former Managers

See also
ASA Football
ASA Basketball
Federação Angolana de Andebol

References

External links
 ASA blog

Sports clubs in Luanda
Angolan handball clubs
Handball clubs established in 1953
1953 establishments in Angola